Shinji Hamada (22 September 1965 – 20 November 2021), better known as Toyonoumi Shinji, was a Japanese sumo wrestler from Buzen, Fukuoka. He made his professional debut in March 1981 and reached the top division in November 1988. He was known by the shikona Takanohama until 1990. His highest rank was maegashira 1. He did not miss a single bout in his 19-year professional career. Upon retirement from active competition he became an elder in the Japan Sumo Association, under the name Yamahibiki. He left the Sumo Association in June 2002.

Career
Born Shinji Hamada in Buzen, Fukuoka, he was first spotted while at elementary school by ozeki Takanohana Kenshi, who was on a regional tour, and the youngster was promised a spot in Futagoyama stable. After graduating from junior high in March 1981, he made his professional debut alongside future sekiwake Tochitsukasa. In March 1982 he followed the now retired Takanohana to a new stable the former ozeki had founded, Fujishima. Having previously fought under his own surname of Hamada, to mark the occasion his shikona was modified to Takanohama. He rose steadily up the ranks, reaching the elite sekitori level in September 1987 when he was promoted to the juryo division. In November 1988 having won the juryo yusho or tournament championship he made his debut in the top makuuchi division alongside Saganobori. These two were the final new makuuchi wrestlers of the Shōwa era. He fell back to juryo in July 1989 but immediately returned. In July 1990 he switched to the shikona of Toyonoumi, which he was to use for the rest of his career. In January 1992 he took a second juryo division championship – in the same tournament that his stablemate Takahanada (the son of his stablemaster) won the makuuchi division title. In February 1993 he found himself back under the Futagoyama banner when his original stable and Fujishima merged following the retirement of Futagoyama Oyakata (former yokozuna Wakanohana Kanji I).

Despite fighting in the top division for a total of thirty tournaments, Toyonoumi never won a special prize or managed to defeat a yokozuna. He never reached a sanyaku position, his highest rank being maegashira 1 which he achieved in September 1992. His last appearance in the top division was in March 1994 but he carried on fighting for another five years after that, finally announcing his retirement in March 1999 facing certain demotion to the unsalaried makushita division. He had been an active wrestler for 19 years and had never missed a bout in his entire career, fighting 1316 consecutive matches – the eighth highest in sumo history.

Retirement from sumo
Toyonoumi's danpatsu-shiki or official retirement ceremony was held on 3 October 1999 at the Ryogoku Kokugikan, with around 3000 guests. He remained in the sumo world as a coach at his stable under the elder name of Yamahibiki Oyakata, but he was only renting the elder stock and he left the Japan Sumo Association in June 2002. The Sumo Association announced that he had died of an unspecified illness on 20 November 2021, aged 56.

Fighting style
He favoured yotsu-sumo or grappling techniques. He used a hidari-yotsu position on his opponent's mawashi or belt, with a right hand outside, left hand inside grip. His two most common winning kimarite were yori-kiri (force out) and oshi-dashi (push out). Among other techniques he used regularly were kotenage (armlock throw) and kimedashi (arm barring force out).

Career record

See also
Glossary of sumo terms
List of sumo record holders
List of past sumo wrestlers
List of sumo tournament second division champions

References

External links

1965 births
2021 deaths
Japanese sumo wrestlers
People from Buzen, Fukuoka
Sumo people from Fukuoka Prefecture